Weeping for a Bandit is a 1964 Spanish drama film directed by Carlos Saura. It was Saura's first film in color. It was co-produced with France and Italy, and starred Italian Lea Massari and French-Italian Lino Ventura. Thanks to his friendship with Saura, filmmaker Luis Buñuel has a small role. The film was entered into the 14th Berlin International Film Festival.

Cast
 Francisco Rabal – José María 'El Tempranillo'
 Lea Massari – María Jerónima
 Philippe Leroy – Pedro Sánchez
 Lino Ventura – El Lutos
 Manuel Zarzo – El Sotillo
 Silvia Solar – Marquesa de los Cerros
 Fernando Sánchez Polack – Antonio (as Fernando S. Polack)
 Antonio Prieto – El Lero
 José Manuel Martín – El Tuerto
 Agustín González – Capitán Leoncio Valdés
 Venancio Muro – Jiménez
 Rafael Romero (actor) – El gitano
 Gabriele Tinti
 Luis Buñuel – El verdugo
 Antonio Buero Vallejo – El esbirro
 Pablo Runyan - Pintor inglés
 José Hernández -  boy

References

External links
 

1964 films
Spanish drama films
French drama films
Italian drama films
1960s Spanish-language films
1964 drama films
Spain in fiction
Films directed by Carlos Saura
Films scored by Carlo Rustichelli
Films set in the 1820s
Films set in the 1830s
Biographical films about bandits
1960s Spanish films
1960s Italian films
1960s French films